Joško Popović (born 19 January 1966, in Opuzen) is a retired Croatian football striker.

Club career
Popović played for several Prva HNL sides during his career, including NK Zagreb, Kamen Ingrad and HNK Šibenik, with whom he was the league top scorer in the 1998–99 season with 21 goals.

As of May 2010 and the conclusion of the 2009–10 Prva HNL season, Popović is ranked as the third all-time top scorer in Prva HNL with 111 goals scored, behind Igor Cvitanović (126) and Davor Vugrinec (136).

International career
Popović played one game for the Croatia national football team, on 20 April 1994 against Slovakia in a friendly game, scoring in the 67th minute after being brought on at half time as a substitute for Ardian Kozniku.

References

External links
 

1966 births
Living people
People from Opuzen
Association football forwards
Yugoslav footballers
Croatian footballers
Croatia international footballers
FK Velež Mostar players
NK Zagreb players
FC Linz players
HNK Šibenik players
NK Kamen Ingrad players
Croatian Football League players
Austrian Football Bundesliga players
Croatian expatriate footballers
Expatriate footballers in Austria
Croatian expatriate sportspeople in Austria